Luperosaurus corfieldi is a species of gecko, a lizard in the family Gekkonidae. The species is endemic to the Philippines.

Etymology
The specific name, corfieldi, is in honor of English-born American businessman Charles Corfield for his support of biodiversity research and nature conservation in the Philippines.

Habitat

Description

Reproduction
L. corfieldi is oviparous.

References

Further reading
 Gaulke M (2011). The Herpetofauna of Panay Island, Philippines. Frankfurt am Main: Chimaira. 390 pp. . 
 Gaulke M, Rösler H, Brown RM (2007). "A New Species of Luperosaurus (Squamata: Gekkonidae) from Panay Island, Philippines, with Comments on the Taxonomic Status of Luperosaurus Cummingi (Gray, 1845)". Copeia 2007 (2): 413–425. (Luperosaurus corfieldi, new species).
Rösler H (2017). "Gecko-Chorologie (Squamata: Gekkota)". Gekkota (Supplement 4): 1–160. (in German).

Luperosaurus
Reptiles described in 2007
Reptiles of the Philippines
Endemic fauna of the Philippines
Taxa named by Rafe M. Brown